A nuclear explosion is an explosion that occurs as a result of the rapid release of energy from a high-speed nuclear reaction. The driving reaction may be nuclear fission or nuclear fusion or a multi-stage cascading combination of the two, though to date all fusion-based weapons have used a fission device to initiate fusion, and a pure fusion weapon remains a hypothetical device. Nuclear explosions are used in nuclear weapons and nuclear testing.

Atmospheric nuclear explosions are associated with mushroom clouds, although mushroom clouds can occur with large chemical explosions. It is possible to have an air-burst nuclear explosion without those clouds. Nuclear explosions produce radiation and radioactive debris that is harmful to humans and can cause moderate to severe skin burns, eye damage, radiation sickness, radiation-induced cancer and possible death depending on how far from the blast radius a person is. Nuclear explosions can also have detrimental effects on the climate, lasting from months to years. In a 1983 article, Carl Sagan claimed that a small-scale nuclear war could release enough particles into the atmosphere to cause the planet to cool and cause crops, animals, and agriculture to disappear across the globe—an effect named nuclear winter.

History

The beginning (fission explosions) 
The first manmade nuclear explosion occurred on July 16, 1945, at 5:50 am on the Trinity test site near Alamogordo, New Mexico, in the United States, an area now known as the White Sands Missile Range. The event involved the full-scale testing of an implosion-type fission atomic bomb. In a memorandum to the U.S. Secretary of War, General Leslie Groves describes the yield as equivalent to 15,000 to 20,000 tons of TNT. Following this test, a uranium-gun type nuclear bomb (Little Boy) was dropped on the Japanese city of Hiroshima on August 6, 1945, with a blast yield of 15 kilotons; and a plutonium implosion-type bomb (Fat Man) on Nagasaki on August 9, 1945, with a blast yield of 21 kilotons. Fat Man and Little Boy are the only instances in history of nuclear weapons being used as an act of war.

On August 29, 1949, the USSR became the second country to successfully test a nuclear weapon. RDS-1, dubbed "First Lightning" by the Soviets and "Joe-1" by the US, produced a 20 kiloton explosion and was essentially a copy of the American Fat Man plutonium implosion design.

Thermonuclear Era (fusion explosions) 
The United States' first thermonuclear weapon, Ivy Mike, was detonated on 1 November 1952 at Enewetak Atoll and yielded 10 Megatons of explosive force. The first thermonuclear weapon tested by the USSR, RDS-6s (Joe-4), was detonated on August 12, 1953, at the Semipalatinsk Test Site in Kazakhstan and yielded about 400 kilotons. RDS-6s' design, nicknamed the Sloika, was remarkably similar to a version designed for the U.S. by Edward Teller nicknamed the "Alarm Clock", in that the nuclear device was a two stage weapon: the first explosion was triggered by fission and the second more powerful explosion by fusion. The Sloika core consisted of a series of concentric spheres with alternating materials to help boost the explosive yield.

Proliferation Era 
In the years following World War II, eight countries have conducted nuclear tests with 2475 devices fired in 2120 tests. In 1963, the United States, Soviet Union, and United Kingdom signed the Limited Test Ban Treaty, pledging to refrain from testing nuclear weapons in the atmosphere, underwater, or in outer space. The treaty permitted underground tests. Many other non-nuclear nations acceded to the Treaty following its entry into force; however, France and China (both nuclear weapons states) have not.

The primary application to date has been military (i.e. nuclear weapons), and the remainder of explosions include the following:
 Nuclear pulse propulsion, including using a nuclear explosion as asteroid deflection strategy.
 Power generation; see PACER
 Peaceful nuclear explosions

Nuclear weapons

Only two nuclear weapons have been deployed in combat—both by the United States against Japan in World War II. The first event occurred on the morning of 6 August 1945, when the United States Army Air Forces dropped a uranium gun-type device, code-named "Little Boy", on the city of Hiroshima, killing 70,000 people, including 20,000 Japanese combatants and 20,000 Korean slave laborers. The second event occurred three days later when the United States Army Air Forces dropped a plutonium implosion-type device, code-named "Fat Man", on the city of Nagasaki. It killed 39,000 people, including 27,778 Japanese munitions employees, 2,000 Korean slave laborers, and 150 Japanese combatants. In total, around 109,000 people were killed in these bombings. Nuclear weapons are largely seen as a 'deterrent' by most governments; the sheer scale of the destruction caused by nuclear weapons has discouraged their use in warfare.

Nuclear testing

Since the Trinity test and excluding combat use, countries with nuclear weapons have detonated roughly 1,700 nuclear explosions, all but six as tests. Of these, six were peaceful nuclear explosions. Nuclear tests are experiments carried out to determine the effectiveness, yield and explosive capability of nuclear weapons. Throughout the 20th century, most nations that have developed nuclear weapons had a staged test of them. Testing nuclear weapons can yield information about how the weapons work, as well as how the weapons behave under various conditions and how structures behave when subjected to a nuclear explosion. Additionally, nuclear testing has often been used as an indicator of scientific and military strength, and many tests have been overtly political in their intention; most nuclear weapons states publicly declared their nuclear status by means of a nuclear test. Nuclear tests have taken place at more than 60 locations across the world; some in secluded areas and others more densely populated. Detonation of nuclear weapons (in a test or during war) releases radioactive fallout that concerned the public in the 1950s. This led to the Limited Test Ban Treaty of 1963 signed by the United States, Great Britain, and the Soviet Union. This treaty banned nuclear weapons testing in the atmosphere, outer space, and under water.

Effects of nuclear explosions

Shockwaves and radiation 
The dominant effect of a nuclear weapon (the blast and thermal radiation) are the same physical damage mechanisms as conventional explosives, but the energy produced by a nuclear explosive is millions of times more per gram and the temperatures reached are in the tens of megakelvin. Nuclear weapons are quite different from conventional weapons because of the huge amount of explosive energy that they can put out and the different kinds of effects they make, like high temperatures and nuclear radiation.

The devastating impact of the explosion does not stop after the initial blast, as with conventional explosives. A cloud of nuclear radiation travels from the hypocenter of the explosion, causing an impact to life forms even after the heat waves have ceased. The health effects on humans from nuclear explosions comes from the initial shockwave, the radiation exposure, and the fallout. The initial shockwave and radiation exposure come from the immediate blast which has different effects on the health of humans depending on the distance from the center of the blast. The shockwave can rupture eardrums and lungs, can also throw people back, and cause buildings to collapse. Radiation exposure is delivered at the initial blast and can continue for an extended amount of time in the form of nuclear fallout. The main health effect of nuclear fallout is cancer and birth defects because radiation causes changes in cells that can either kill or make them abnormal. Any nuclear explosion (or nuclear war) would have wide-ranging, long-term, catastrophic effects. Radioactive contamination would cause genetic mutations and cancer across many generations.

Nuclear Winter 
Another potential devastating effect of nuclear war is termed nuclear winter. The idea become popularized in mainstream culture during the 1980s, when Richard P. Turco, Owen Toon, Thomas P. Ackerman, James B. Pollack and Carl Sagan collaborated and produced a scientific study which suggested the Earth's weather and climate can be severely impacted by nuclear war. The main idea is that once a conflict begins and the aggressors start detonating nuclear weapons, the explosions will eject small particles from the Earth's surface into the atmosphere as well as nuclear particles. It's also assumed that fires will break out and become widespread, similar to what happened at Hiroshima and Nagasaki during the end of WWII, which will cause soot and other harmful particles to also be introduced into the atmosphere. Once these harmful particles are lofted, strong upper level winds in the troposphere can transport them thousands of kilometers and can end up transporting nuclear fallout and also alter the Earth's radiation budget. Once enough small particles are in the atmosphere, they can act as cloud condensation nuclei which will cause global cloud coverage to increase which in turn blocks incoming solar insolation and starts a global cooling period. This is not unlike one of the leading theories about the extinction of most dinosaur species, in that a large explosion ejected small particulate matter into the atmosphere and resulted in a global catastrophe characterized by cooler temperatures, acid rain, and the KT Layer.

Nuclear explosion impact on humans indoors 
Researchers from the University of Nicosia simulated (Ioannis W. Kokkinakis and Dimitris Drikakis , "Nuclear explosion impact on humans indoors", Physics of Fluids 35, 016114 (2023), using high-order Computational Fluid Dynamics (CFD), an atomic bomb explosion from a typical intercontinental ballistic missile and the resulting blast wave to see how it would affect people sheltering indoors. 
They found that the blast wave was enough in the moderate damage zone to topple some buildings and injure people caught outdoors. However, sturdier buildings, such as concrete structures, can remain standing. The team used advanced computer modeling to study how a nuclear blast wave speeds through a standing structure. Their simulated structure featured rooms, windows, doorways, and corridors and allowed them to calculate the speed of the air following the blast wave and determine the best and worst places to be. The study showed that high airspeeds remain a considerable hazard and can still result in severe injuries or even fatalities.
Furthermore, simply being in a sturdy building is not enough to avoid risk. The tight spaces can increase airspeed, and the involvement of the blast wave causes air to reflect off walls and bend around corners. In the worst cases, this can produce a force equivalent to multiple times a human’s body weight. The most dangerous critical indoor locations to avoid are windows, corridors, and doors. The above study received considerable interest from the international press.

See also

 Lists of nuclear disasters and radioactive incidents
 Soviet nuclear well collapses
 Visual depictions of nuclear explosions in fiction

References

External links
 Video — Nuclear Explosion Power Comparison
 NUKEMAP2.7 (modelling effects of nuclear explosion of various yield in various cities)

Nuclear physics
Nuclear chemistry
Nuclear weapon design
Nuclear accidents and incidents
Articles containing video clips